Eli (11th century BCE) was, according to the Book of Samuel, a high priest and a  judge of the Israelites in the city of  Shiloh, ancient Israel. When Hannah came to Shiloh to pray for a son, Eli initially accused her of drunkenness, but when she protested her innocence, Eli wished her well. Hannah's eventual child, Samuel, was raised by Eli in the tabernacle. When Eli failed to rein in the abusive behavior of his own sons, God promised to punish his family, which resulted in the death of Eli and his sons. Later biblical passages mention the fortunes of several of Eli's descendants, and he figures prominently in Samaritan religious tradition.

Biblical narrative
Eli was the high priest (kohen gadol) of Shiloh, the second-to-last Israelite judge (succeeded only by Samuel) before the rule of the Kings of Israel and Judah.

Hannah
This story of Hannah, with which the Books of Samuel begin, involves Eli. Hannah was the wife of Elkanah. She was childless. Elkanah also had another wife (Peninnah) who bore him children. Peninnah, at every chance, teased and criticised Hannah about her barrenness, to the point of Hannah's deep despair. Their husband Elkanah saw Hannah's distress, and attempted to discover the cause of her distress by asking "Hannah, why do you weep? Why do you not eat? Why is your heart sad? Am I not more to you than ten sons?"

The story indicates that Hannah gave no answer to the questions, and instead rose and presented herself before God. She wept bitterly in the temple of Shiloh. In her despair, Hannah prayed to God for a child, and promising that if her prayer is granted, she would dedicate her son to God. When Eli found Hannah in the temple, she was praying silently with her lips moving. Eli witnessed this unusual behavior, and concluded that Hannah was intoxicated. After Hannah's explanation of her sobriety, Eli said, “Go in peace, and may the God of Israel grant you what you have requested.” Hannah went home, filled with hope. Subsequently, Hannah became pregnant; her child was named Samuel. At the time to offer the yearly sacrifice at the temple, Hannah remained home. She promised to go to the temple, when Samuel was weaned and planned to leave him with Eli to be trained as a Nazirite.

The sons of Eli

The sons of Eli, Hophni and Phinehas, meanwhile, were behaving wickedly, for example by taking for themselves all the prime cuts of meat from sacrifices, and by committing adultery with the women who serve at the sanctuary entrance. Eli was aware of their behavior but he rebuked them too lightly and ultimately did not stop them. The sons continued in their sinful behavior, and "a man of God" prophesied to Eli that Eli and his family would be punished for this, with all male descendants dying before reaching old age and being placed in positions subservient to prophets from other lineages. The curse alludes to a previous promise from God of Eli's lineage continuing eternally (Eli being a descendant of Aaron, to whom the promise was initially given [Exodus 28]) (c.f. similar promises to King David and Jehonadab). While this continuation was not revoked, a curse was placed on all of Eli's male descendants forever. As a sign of the accuracy of this future, Eli was told that his sons would die on the same day.

Samuel's training
Eli went on to train Samuel. When Samuel heard God speaking to him, he at first mistook God for Eli; Eli, who didn't hear God calling Samuel, eventually realized the truth, and instructed Samuel on how to respond. Samuel was told that God's threat would be carried out on Eli and his family. Eli asked Samuel what he had been told, insisting that he be told the whole truth, and so Samuel did; Eli reacted by saying that God will do as He judges best.

Philistine attack and the death of Eli

Some years later, the Philistines attacked Eben-Ezer, eventually capturing the Ark of the Covenant from the Israelites and killing Eli's sons who had accompanied the Ark to battle. The Israelites had brought the Ark with them to battle under the premise that it would bring them victory, an assumption that proved to be incorrect. Eli, who was nearly blind, was sitting at the front gate to hear the returning soldiers return was unaware of the event until he asked about all the commotion in the city. A soldier had returned brought the news of the battle to the people. He told Eli what happened. In reaction to the news that the Ark of God had been captured, Eli fell backwards out of the chair and died.

He was a Judge of Israel for a total of 40 years. His daughter-in-law, the wife of Phinehas, was pregnant and near the time of delivery. When she heard the news that the Ark of God had been captured and that her father-in-law and husband were dead, she went into labour and gave birth, but was overcome by labour pains. As she lay dying, the women attending her said, Don't despair; you have given birth to a son. But she did not respond or pay any attention. She named the boy Ichabod, saying The Glory has departed from Israel, because of the capture of the Ark of God and the deaths of her father-in-law and her husband.

Era

Samuel, who fought the Philistine incursions, judged Israel for 20 years. Some scholars, like Kessler, and Nowack have argued that there is likely to have been some overlap between the time of Samuel and that of Eli. However, the Book of Judges always mentions the years of oppression in contrast to the period of a judge's dispensation; since the early parts of Eli's rule do not appear to occur during a time of oppression, this appears to rule out any overlap with the Philistine oppression that Samson, a previous judge, had lived under.

Genealogy

Though his own genealogy is not given by the text, a number of scholars  have determined a genealogy for Eli, based on that given to his sons in other passages. Abiathar is described by the Book of Chronicles as being a direct (paternal) descendant of Ithamar; the Books of Samuel state that Abiathar was a son of Ahimelech and that Ahimelech was a son of Ahitub, who is the brother of Ichabod. Consequently, since the narrative states that Ichabod was the son of Phinehas, and that Phinehas was the son of Eli, a number of scholars have drawn the conclusion that Eli must be a descendant of Ithamar.

Descendants
The Elides, or House of Eli, included:
Ahimelech, great-grandson of Eli: slain by Doeg the Edomite, fulfilling part of the curse on the House of Eli that none of his male descendants would live to old age. 
Abiathar, son of Ahimelech: great-great-grandson of Eli; the only survivor of the massacre at Nob, and the last High Priest of the House of Eli, deposed from office by King Solomon, thus fulfilling the other part of the curse on the House of Eli that the priesthood would pass from his family (1 Kings 2:26-27).

Other sources

Talmud
The Talmud lists Eli as a prophet.

The rabbis described Samuel, Eli's student, as having ruled that it was legitimate for laymen to slaughter sacrifices, since the halakha only insisted that the priests bring the blood (cf. , Zevahim 32a). Eli is said to have reacted to this logic of Samuel by arguing that it was correct, but Samuel should be put to death for making legal statements while Eli (his mentor) was present.

In rabbinical literature

Phineas/Ithamar controversy
Rabbinical commentators explain that the continuity of high priesthood is put forth to the descendants of Phineas from this noted verse. According to some rabbinical commentators Phineas sinned due to his not availing his servitude of Torah instruction to the masses at the time leading up to the Battle of Gibeah. In addition, he also failed to address the needs of relieving Jephthah of his vow. As consequence, the high priesthood was taken from him and given (temporarily, see next section) to the offspring of Ithamar, essentially Eli and his sons.

Priesthood transition 
Upon the sin of Eli's sons, Hophni and Phinehas, it was prophesied that the high priesthood would be returned to the sons of Eleazar:

A number of scholars indicate that Zadok was the subject of the prophecy to Eli when Zadok, said to be of the progeny of Eleazar, was ultimately appointed as high priest.

Zadok, as a patrilineal descendant of Phinehas (son of Eleazar) assumed the high priesthood. His sons were Ahimaaz and Azariah followed by his descendants who held the high priesthood up to the destruction of the First Temple and, following the building of the Second Temple, resumed the high priesthood, as per Joshua the High Priest (along with Ezra) being of Sons of Zadok lineage.

Descendants
In addition to the individuals whose descent from Eli can be determined from the Biblical text, rabbinic literature cites other individuals as descendants of Eli.
Jeremiah: it is suggested that Jeremiah was descended from Abiathar (When King Solomon thrust out Abiathar from the priesthood, he exiled him to his fields at Anathoth (1 Kings 2:26-27). Jeremiah was one of the priests living at Anathoth (Jeremiah 1:1), so this suggestion would seem quite reasonable).

Ezekiel, according to Rabbinical Literature, was a son of Jeremiah.
Rabbah bar Nahmani, Babylon Jewish Talmudist (Amora).
Abaye, Babylon Jewish Talmudist, nephew of Rabbah bar Nahmani (Amora)
Bebai ben Abaye, Babylon Jewish Talmudist, son of Abaye
Rabbah died at age 40 and his nephew Abaye died at age 60.

Samaritan sources
The Samaritans assert that Mount Gerizim was the original Holy Place of Israel from the time that Joshua conquered Israel and the ten tribes settled the land. According to the Bible, the story of Mount Gerizim takes us back to the story of the time when Moses ordered Joshua to take the Twelve Tribes of Israel to the mountains by Shechem and place half of the tribes, six in number, on the top of Mount Gerizim (Mount of the Blessing), and the other half in Mount Ebal (Mount of the Curse). The two mountains were used to symbolize the significance of the commandments and serve as a warning to whoever disobeyed them.

Abu l-Fath, who in the fourteenth century C.E. wrote the major work of Samaritan history, comments on Samaritan origins as follows:

Further, the Samaritan Chronicle Adler, or New Chronicle, believed to have been composed in the 18th century C.E. using earlier chronicles as sources states:

According to the Samaritans this marked the end of the Age of Divine Favor called רידון (Ridhwan) or רהוּתה (Rahuta), which began with Moses. Thus began the פנוּתה (Fanuta) Era of Divine Disfavor when God looks away from the people. According to the Samaritans the age of divine favor will only return with the coming of the Taheb (Messiah or Restorer).

Likewise according to Samaritan sources, the high priests line of the sons of Phineas died out in 1624 C.E. with the death of the 112th High Priest Shlomyah ben Pinhas when the priesthood was transferred to the sons of Ithamar.

See also
Biblical judges
Books of Samuel

Notes

References

External links

 
11th-century BC biblical rulers
11th-century BC clergy
11th-century BCE High Priests of Israel
11th-century BCE Hebrew people
12th-century BCE High Priests of Israel
Books of Samuel people
Judges of ancient Israel
Prophets in Christianity
Prophets of the Hebrew Bible
Mythological blind people